Olavi Aleksanteri Lahtela (3 June 1915 – 29 December 1968) was a Finnish politician, born in Kemijärvi. He served as Deputy Minister of Communications from 1 November to 18 December 1963. Lahtela was a Member of the Parliament of Finland from 1958 until his death in 1968.

References

1915 births
1968 deaths
People from Kemijärvi
People from Oulu Province (Grand Duchy of Finland)
Centre Party (Finland) politicians
Government ministers of Finland
Members of the Parliament of Finland (1958–62)
Members of the Parliament of Finland (1962–66)
Members of the Parliament of Finland (1966–70)
University of Helsinki alumni
Finnish military personnel of World War II